Crystal Symphony was a cruise ship owned and operated by Crystal Cruises before the line went out of business. She was built in 1995 at Kværner Masa-Yards Turku New Shipyard, Finland. She was the oldest vessel in the Crystal Cruises fleet.

Concept and construction
Crystal Symphony was ordered in December 1992 and entered service in May 1995.

The ship was docked in Sydney Harbour for the Olympics in 2000.

The ship was refitted a second time in 2006. This process, which cost US$23 million, was the largest refit ever for Crystal Cruises. During this refit, Crystal employed over 750 external workers to join the existing 545 crew to ensure a timely completion. The refit was done in BAE Systems Norfolk Ship Repair in Norfolk, Virginia.

In 2009 Crystal Symphony underwent a third refit costing US$25 million. The refit was completed at Boston Ship Repair's South Boston Dry dock.

In June 2012, the ship completed a two-week "extreme makeover" done by 1,100 workers (including the crew) at the Blohm + Voss docks in Germany.

Arrest
In January 2022, a warrant was issued for the arrest of the ship should she reenter US waters. The issue was unpaid fuel bills. The ship diverted to Bimini and made arrangements to shuttle its passengers back to the United States. On 4 February 2022, both Crystal Symphony and her sister, Crystal Serenity were arrested while in  Bahamian waters. The total amount owed for fuel was reported to be about 4.6 million dollars.

In June 2022 she was sold at auction to CSY Ltd., reported to be a shell corporation for the actual buyer, for $25M USD.

Since July 2022, the ship is undergoing refurbishments in Trieste, Italy.

References

External links

Official website

Cruise ships
Ships built in Turku
1995 ships